The 2009–10 Slovenian Football Cup was the 19th season of the Slovenian Football Cup, Slovenia's football knockout competition. The tournament system was changed for this season.

Qualified clubs

2008–09 Slovenian PrvaLiga members
Maribor
Celje
Rudar Velenje
Domžale
Gorica
Nafta Lendava
Interblock
Koper
Primorje
Drava Ptuj

Qualified through MNZ Regional Cups
MNZ Ljubljana:  Olimpija, Bela Krajina, Radomlje
MNZ Maribor: Železničar Maribor, Dravograd, Slivnica
MNZ Celje: Dravinja, Zreče
MNZ Koper: Jadran Dekani, Ankaran
MNZ Nova Gorica: Tolmin, Idrija
MNZ Murska Sobota: Mura 05, Serdica
MNZ Lendava: Črenšovci, Odranci
MNZG-Kranj: Triglav Kranj, Kranj
MNZ Ptuj: Aluminij, Stojnci

Preliminary round
These matches took place on 2 September 2009.

First round
These matches took place on 16 September 2009.

Second round
Gorica, Interblock, Maribor and Rudar Velenje received byes to this round. These matches took place on 20 and 21 October 2009.

Quarter-finals
The first legs took place on 17 March 2010 and the second legs took place on 24 March 2010.

First legs

Second legs

Semi-finals
The four winners from the previous round competed in this round. The first legs took place on 13 and 14 April 2010 and the second legs took place on 21 April 2010.

First legs

Second legs

Final

References

Slovenian Football Cup seasons
Cup
Slovenia